Palav may refer to:
 Pilaf, rice dish
Shyam Palav, Indian cinematographer
Bhagwan Dada, Indian actor, born Bhagwan Aabaji Palav